U.S. Army Berlin (USAB) was a command of the United States Army created in December 1961 at the height of the Berlin Wall crisis. USAB was a combined command with the Headquarters, U.S. Command Berlin (USCOB). This combined organization was sometimes called the "Berlin Command". USCOB/USAB was a separate command from the U.S. Army Europe (USAREUR) which had previously been in command of American troops in West Berlin.

The major general who commanded this organization held the title of "Commandant; U.S. Commander Berlin; Commander, U.S. Army Berlin". A brigadier general served as the "Commander, Berlin Brigade (Infantry); Deputy Commander, U.S. Army Berlin and Community Commander".

The shoulder sleeve insignia adopted by USAB was the same as the patch used by the Berlin Brigade – the USAREUR patch with a Berlin tab. By the mid-1960s, the Berlin tab was incorporated into the patch.

Its headquarters were located at the Clay Headquarters Compound on Clayallee in Berlin's Zehlendorf district.

Units locations 

Units under the command of USAB included the Berlin Brigade, the Medical and Dental Activities, Tempelhof Central Airport (United States Air Force base), Armed Forces Network (radio and television affiliate AFN Berlin), the U.S. Military Liaison Mission and the United States Army Field Station Berlin.

Troops assigned to USAB were housed at several kasernes in Zehlendorf and Steglitz, including Andrews Barracks, McNair Barracks, and Turner Barracks. Families lived in the housing areas near the Clay Compound, and in the Düppel, Dahlem, and Lichterfelde neighborhoods. Truman Plaza, located across Clayallee from the Clay Headquarters Compound, held the post exchange, commissary, Army Post Office (APO), American Express bank, Stars & Stripes book store, barber, florist, Deutsche Bundespost, and the Major Arthur D. Nicholson Memorial Library. Schools for the children of service members, Thomas A. Roberts Berlin American Elementary School (TAR) and Berlin-American High School  (BAHS), were located close to Truman Plaza.

History 

After the reunification of Germany on 3 October 1990, the presence of U.S. military forces in Berlin was no longer necessary, but was retained (along with the British and French forces) until the Russian military withdrew from eastern Germany. USAB was inactivated on 12 July 1994 with President Bill Clinton participating in the casing of the colors ceremony. Since then, USAB housing areas, schools, and the Army Hospital have reverted to civilian use, some for German citizens, and others being taken over by the U.S. Embassy. Truman Plaza was razed in 1996 in anticipation of new housing for employees of the German federal government relocating from the former capital Bonn, which began in 2009/2010. Across the street from Truman Plaza was the Berlin Brigade headquarters, part of which serves as an annex of the Embassy of the United States in Berlin. The nearby library and adjoining Outpost Theater have been converted into the Allied Museum, which documents the American, British and French presence in Berlin during the Cold War.

Troop units assigned to USCOB/USAB 

Command organization in the late 1980s –

 Headquarters, Berlin Brigade
 4th Battalion, 502nd Infantry
 5th Battalion, 502nd Infantry
 6th Battalion, 502nd Infantry
 Combat Support Battalion
 Headquarters & Service Company
 A Company (Provisional)
 C Battery 94th Artillery (redesignated E Bty, 320th FAR in 1986)
 43rd Chemical Detachment
 42nd Postal Branch
 42nd Engineer Company
 E-320th Field Artillery Battery
 Company "F", 40th Armor Regiment
 Helmstedt Support Detachment
 US Military Community Activity (USMCA)
 298th Army Band
 Signal Support Company
 287th Military Police Company
 Aviation Detachment
 6941st Guard Battalion
 U.S. Army Field Station Berlin
 U.S. Military Liaison Mission to the Commander-in-Chief, Group of Soviet Forces in Germany
United States Army Europe Technical Intelligence Center, Field Team #3 w/duty station Berlin (UTIC Fld TM #3) 
 Joint Allied Refugee Operations Center (J-ROC)
 Allied Control Authority
 Allied Kommandatura
 Berlin MEDDAC
 Berlin DENTAC
 168th Medical Detachment (Veterinary Services)
 Tempelhof Central Airport
 766th MI Det, 66th MI Grp, Intel & Scrty
 Naval Advisor
 U.S. Army Special Security Det (Berlin)
 U.S. Army EOD detachment
 U.S. Army Physical Security Support Element - Berlin

Footnotes

External links
 Kameradschaftsseite des USA 6941st Guard Battalion Berlin
 Ein kleiner Verein der sich mit den Fahrzeugen der Alliierten beschaftigt
 West Alliierte in Berlin 
 History of the French, American and British Berlin Brigades
 Allied Museum Berlin
 6941st Guard Battalion – US Army Berlin Brigade
 BerlinBrigade.com dedicated to all that served in West Berlin from 1945 to 1994
 Berlin 1969 life of the Western Allies at the midpoint of the Cold War

U.S. Army Berlin
U.S. Army Berlin
Military units and formations established in 1961
Berlin
Cold War military history of Germany